À la folie ("To Madness") is a 1994 French drama film  by Diane Kurys with music by Michael Nyman. It entered the competition at the 51st Venice International Film Festival.

Cast
 Anne Parillaud as Alice
 Béatrice Dalle as Elsa
  as Franck
 Bernard Verley as Sanders
 Alain Chabat as Thomas
  as Raymond
 Marie Guillard as Betty
 Michael Massee (uncredited)

Plot 
Two rival sisters, Alice and Elsa, have been apart for two years. Alice, a promising young artist, lives in an attic flat in Paris. Her lover Franck, a boxer, has just moved in with her. Problems for the happy couple ensue when Elsa, a bored housewife, suddenly appears unannounced at their door after leaving her cheating husband Thomas and their two children, and a menage-a-trois develops. Elsa immediately begins trying to dominate their lives. Alice wants the out-of-control Elsa, who disrupts their life by playing psychological games with them, to leave, but then suddenly changes her mind, unable to bring herself to throw Elsa out. To thank her, Elsa destroys her art studio, has sex with Franck, convinces him that Alice is unbalanced, and then ties Alice up in her apartment.

Music

The music by Michael Nyman has been praised as one of his better works, and considered unusually buried in the sound mix of the film.  The album is Nyman's 23rd release, and the fourteenth with the Michael Nyman Band.  The American album became very difficult to come by; American Nyman fans attempting to special order the album only a few years later were often presented with copies of Randy Edelman's Six Days Seven Nights, derived from distributors' fuzzy searches.  In France, however, the album was promoted as "Michael Nyman Nouvel Album."

The score features yet another of Michael Nyman's waltzes.  "Waltzing the Bird" is based on Nyman's early "Waltz in F," which appeared on Michael Nyman, although it develops in a very different direction.  "Love Theme" is a very loose reworking of material from the String Quartet No. 3 with material from other themes written for the score of the film.

The only liner notes on the French release of the album are an uncredited synopsis of the film in French.

Track listing
Solitude 1:36
Broken Glass 4:58
Sisters 1:42
The Intruder 2:40
Waltzing the Bird 3:16
A New Beginning 1:22
Stolen Memories 5:48
À la Folie... 5:48
The Streets of Paris 2:39
Love Forever 1:19
Love Theme 2:35
Point of No Return 2:55
Escape 3:37
Broken Dreams 4:19
Dark Fantasy 2:25
Six Days, Six Nights 5:51

Personnel
Musicians from the Michael Nyman Band

Beverley Davison – violin
Ann Morfee – violin
Marshall Marcus – violin
Katherine Shave – violin
Kate Musker – viola
Anthony Hinnigan – cello
William Schofield – cello
Christopher Laurence – bass
Tim Amhurst – bass
John Harle – soprano/alto saxophones
David Roach – soprano/alto saxophones
Andrew Findon – flute/piccolo/baritone saxophone
Nigel Barr – Trombone/Tuba
Steve Sidwell – trumpet/Flugelhorn/piccolo trumpet
Marjorie Dunn – horn
Martin Elliott – bass guitar
Michael Nyman – piano
music composed, arranged, conducted, and produced by Michael Nyman
Published by Chester Music Ltd./Michael Nyman Ltd.
Engineer: Michael J. Dutton
Assistant Engineer: Dillon Gallagher
Mixed at CTS Studios, London
Edited at Transfermation and Abbey Road Studios, London
Artist representative for Michael Nyman:  Nigel Barr
Design, illustration, and photography by Dave McKean @ Hourglass
Photography from 6 Days 6 Nights by Jean-Marie Leroy

References

External links

1994 films
French drama films
1990s French-language films
Films directed by Diane Kurys
Films scored by Michael Nyman
1990s French films